The Peugeot JetForce is a scooter manufactured by Peugeot Motocycles from 2002 until early 2009. It was available in a  four-stroke version and a  two-stroke along with its several sub-types.

Both the 125 and 50cc variants use an EFI system which was sourced from SynerJect - originally a joint venture between the Orbital Engine Company (Balcatta, Western Australia) and Siemens - now fully owned by Continental. The EFI is a direct descendant of the "OCP" (Orbital Combustion Process) system. Where the 125cc 4-Stroke uses a conventional port injected fuel system, the 2 stroke uses the OCP fuel and compressed air injection system. In this a crank/eccentric mounted air pump is used to directly inject air and fuel into the cylinder.

The EFI computers are manufactured by Philips in Europe. The 125cc throttle body is manufactured by Bing in Germany. Other components such as fuel pumps are sourced by Synerject.

Brakes are disc front and rear however ABS was an option on all models.

Electrics are 12V on both models.

125 cc 

50 cc 
2-Stroke. This model sold as an "unrestricted" scooter, which could reach  according to the technical specification.
Until 2004, the  model sold with electronic fuel injection (TSDI); afterwards, the carburettor version (C-TECH) was introduced. Both versions have separate oil tank.

All engines are water-cooled and have a EURO-2 catalytic converter. The petrol tank can hold  of unleaded petrol. The transmission is always a continuously variable transmission.

Supercharger
A  model with a supercharger was available from the end of 2003, called the JetForce 125 Compressor. It was said to be the first two-wheeler available from a manufacturer with a supercharger since the 1930s BMW Type 255, and was said to have the power of a typical  scooter.

See also
List of motorcycles by type of engine

References

Motor scooters
Jetforce
Mopeds
Motorcycles introduced in 2002
Two-stroke motorcycles